The Casco Bay Weekly was a free alternative weekly newspaper published in Portland, Maine from May 26, 1988 to 2004. It was similar to other alternative newspapers such as The Village Voice and Boston Phoenix.

In 1990, Dodge Martin, who also owned the Maine Times newspaper, purchased Casco Bay Weekly from Mogul Media Inc. At the time, CBW had a circulation of approximately 20,000 entirely in the Greater Portland area. The paper struggled with declining ad revenues after the establishment of another alternative newspaper, the Portland Phoenix, in 1999.

The paper's final editor, Chris Busby, founded The Bollard in 2005.

References

1988 establishments in Maine
2004 disestablishments in Maine
Newspapers established in 1988
Publications disestablished in 2004
Alternative weekly newspapers published in the United States
Weekly magazines published in the United States
Free newspapers
Defunct newspapers published in Maine
Newspapers published in Portland, Maine